ARA Comodoro Rivadavia (Q-11) is a survey ship of the Argentine Navy assigned to the national Hydrographic Naval Service (SHN for Servicio de Hidrografia Naval) which among other things is responsible of the maintenance of nautical charts, balises and lighthouses.

Design

History

Comodoro Rivadavia was built by Mestrina shipyard in Tigre, Buenos Aires and commissioned into the Argentine Navy in December 1974. She was the second navy ship to be named upon the city of Comodoro Rivadavia which in turn is named after sailor Martín Rivadavia, country's first Navy Minister (charge now succeeded by the Minister of Defense) and grandson of President Bernardino Rivadavia.

The ship is classified as a hydrographic vessel and equipped with probes and bathymetric sensors.

The ship remained on the navy list as of 2022, but was reported as likely soon to be placed on the disposal list.

References

Notes

Sources
Details, Official Argentine Navy website

External links
Picture at official website
MinDef video

Auxiliary ships of the Argentine Navy
Research vessels of Argentina
Ships built in Argentina
1974 ships